Andrew Brier House, also known as the Brier-Butler House, is a historic home located in Liberty Township, Warren County, Indiana.  It was built in 1855, and is a -story, Greek Revival style brick dwelling with a rear wing.  It has a gable roof and a large wraparound porch added at a later date.  Also on the property are the contributing large gambrel roofed barn, ceramic silo, corn crib, garage, and pole barn.

It was listed on the National Register of Historic Places in 1986.

References

Houses on the National Register of Historic Places in Indiana
Greek Revival houses in Indiana
Houses completed in 1855
Buildings and structures in Warren County, Indiana
National Register of Historic Places in Warren County, Indiana